Moser may refer to:
 Moser (surname)
 An individual who commits the act of Mesirah in Judaism

Places 
 Moser Glacier, a glacier on the west coast of Graham Land, Antarctica
 Moser River, Nova Scotia, Canada
 Moser Bay Seaplane Base, a public-use seaplane base in Moser Bay, Alaska
 Moser Channel, a passage spanned by the Seven Mile Bridge in the Florida Keys
 Moser Farm, a historic farm near Kirschnerville, New York

Companies 
 Moser Baer, a technology company based in New Delhi, India
 Moser Cicli, an Italian bicycle manufacturer
 Moser Glass, a Czech-based glass manufacturer
 Moser's Rides, an Italian amusement ride manufacturer

See also 
 Kolmogorov–Arnold–Moser theorem, mathematical theorem of dynamical systems
 Moser Gender Planning Framework, a tool for gender analysis in development planning
 Moser number, the number represented by "2 in a megagon", where a "megagon" is a polygon with "mega" sides
 Moser polygon notation, a means of expressing certain extremely large numbers
 Moser spindle, an undirected graph named after mathematicians Leo Moser and his brother William
 Moser–Trudinger inequality, a theorem in mathematical analysis
 Möser (surname)